Mimmo Liguoro (born July 16, 1941) is an Italian journalist. He was chief editor and host of TG2 from 1982 to 1995 and TG3 from 1995 to 2006.

He was born in Torre del Greco.

References
www.telegiornaliste.com 

Italian journalists
Italian male journalists
1941 births
Living people
People from Torre del Greco
20th-century Italian journalists